If I Should Fall may refer to:

If I Should Fall, a 2010 Canadian documentary film by director Brendon Culliton about death of Canadian soldier Marc Diab
If I Should Fall from Grace with God, a 1988 album by the Pogues
"If I Should Fall from Grace with God" (song), lead song from the album above
If I Should Fall to the Field, a 2002 album by Steve Von Till

See also
If I Should Fall Behind (disambiguation)